Senator Bewley may refer to:

Janet Bewley (Wisconsin politician) (born 1951), Wisconsin State Senate
William Bewley (New York politician) (1878–1953), New York State Senate